The Von Zedtwitz Life Master Pairs national bridge championship is held at the summer American Contract Bridge League (ACBL) North American Bridge Championship (NABC).

Usually called simply the "Life Master Pairs" or "LM Pairs", this is a six-session pairs tournament open to all players without regard to age, sex, nationality, or membership. It is restricted to Life Masters, now a modest career record in ACBL sanctioned play, which leading players from overseas are able to achieve by attending a few NABC meets. If it remains the most prestigious competition for pairs, that may be because it is older than the parallel spring and fall events, the Norman Kay Platinum Pairs established 2010 and Edgar Kaplan Blue Ribbon Pairs established 1963.

History

The Life Master Pairs is a six-session event with two qualifying, two semi-final and two final sessions.  It is restricted to Life Masters. At stake is the Von Zedtwitz Gold Cup.
In 1930, Waldemar von Zedtwitz donated the Gold Cup, which was presented to the winners of the Life Master Pairs. The first winners: Von Zedtwitz and P. Hal Sims.

The trophy was initially contested by master players who had qualified by winning a national championship. It was a four-session event, and the field was limited to 64 players so that a complete movement could be played.

The trophy was originally presented on the basis that three wins by one player would secure him outright possession of the trophy. This feat was achieved by Howard Schenken in 1934. Schenken won in 1931 and 1933 with David Burnstine and 1934 with Richard L. Frey. He also won in 1941 with Merwyn Maier and in 1943 with John R. Crawford.
The cup, put back into competition by the donor, was stolen in 1954 while in the possession of John Hubbell, who held the LM Pairs title. The theft followed a television appearance during which Hubbell had exhibited the trophy and given the address of his bridge club where the cup was normally displayed.

The trophy was never recovered and the present cup is an exact replica.
Mary Jane Farell and Marilyn Johnson are the only pair of women to win the event. Their victory came in 1978.

The record score for the event belongs to S. Garton Churchill and Cecil Head, who won in 1948 --- scoring 65% as an average for four sessions and 77.4% in a single session.

Winners

The first seven champion "Master Pairs", from 1930 to 1936, and also the 1931 to 1933 runners-up, each comprised two of the nine men named Life Masters #1 to #9 by the American Bridge League when it introduced the title in 1936.

Only one pair has defended its title successfully, the 1971 and 1972 winners Al Roth and Barbara Rappaport.

See also
Edgar Kaplan Blue Ribbon Pairs, or Blue Ribbon Pairs
Norman Kay Platinum Pairs, or Platinum Pairs

References

Other sources
 List of previous winners, Page 6. 

 2009 winners, Page 1. 

 "Search Results: Von Zedtwitz LM Pairs". ACBL. Visit "NABC Winners"; select a Spring NABC. Retrieved 2014-06-05. 

North American Bridge Championships